Isabella of Ibelin may refer to:

Isabella of Ibelin, Queen of Cyprus and Jerusalem (1241–1324), wife of Hugh III of Cyprus
Isabella of Beirut (1252–1282), wife of Hugh II of Cyprus
Isabella of Ibelin (died 1315), wife of Guy of Ibelin